George Washington Reamer  (1864 – November 20, 1938), was an early American pioneer, mining engineer, and building contractor, who in 1908 built one of the earliest homes on Reamer's Point, known today as Carmel Point, just outside the city limits of Carmel-by-the-Sea, California.

Early life 

George W. Reamer was born in 1864 in Foresthill, Placer County, California. His father was George W. Reamer Sr. (1828-1892) of New Brunswick, New Jersey, and his mother was Sarah Elizabeth McDonald (1842-1910). His father came out West, with his wife, in 1949, during the Gold rush and became a placer miner. He had water rights on the north fork of the American River and the Yuba River. Reamer Street in Auburn, California is named after him. He owned several mines including the Jenny Lind Mine at Foresthill. His mother was a pioneer clubwomen of the San Francisco Bay Area and former president of the California Woman's Press Association.

Reamer married Jennie Florence Jennings (1865-1944) on April 16, 1888 in San Francisco. They had one son, Howard Jennings Reamer (1889-1967). They were divorced on August 26, 1892 because of "failure to provide for her support."

Professional background
Reamer followed his father in the gold mining business. In his youth he helped transport gold from the mines on horseback in northern California. He then worked as a placer mining engineer. In 1892, he was granted a patent for the Pacific Coast for preparing figs.

In 1904, Reamer moved to Carmel-by-the-Sea to build one of the first homes on the oceanside of Carmel Point for his cousin, Florence E. Wells (1864-1966), called Driftwood Cottage, on the corner of Scenic Drive and Ocean View Avenue, fronting the Carmel River lagoon. Reamer constructed several of the first houses in Carmel, many with his signature lava rock fireplace. He also designed and built the altar for the All Saints’ Church in Carmel, which is now the Episcopal Church in Novato, California.

George W. Reamer House

In 1908, Reamer built a house for himself and his mother, across from the Wells house, south of the Tor House. The area in front of the Wells and Reamer houses became known as Reamer's Point, now known as Carmel Point. Florence Reamer and Wells were good friends and were related through his sister Anna Reamer's (1863-1925) son, David Duncan Oliphant Jr., (1866-1968) who married Fay Mckee (1887-1971). Fay Mckee's grandmother Susan Mckee (1842-1929) and Reynold C. Chapman (1819-1884) had one child Florence, who later married Frederick E Wells. 

Reamer and Wells won a battle against the Carmel Sanitary Board, which wanted to use the beach below their properties to dump water from the sewage tank onto the beach. On March 6, 1953, eight acres of beach were purchased from Florence E. Wells by the state of California for use as a state park. 

In early 1910, Reamer built a house for his mother, Sarah E. Reamer, but his mother died on May 3, 1910. Reamer inherited the Carmel Point house and a fortune of $40,000. He lavishly spent $4,500 of the money in less the four months. A family meeting led to a Alameda County Superior Court to provide him with attorney Silas W. Mack as his legal guardian.

On January 18, 1912, Reamer, at the age of 47, married Catherine Angelina Bain (1880-1966) in Monterey, California. She was born in Leeds, Quebec, Canada on September 2, 1880. They had two children together, Sara "Sis" Elizabeth Reamer-Elber (1914-) born in Monterey, California and Bain Reamer (1913-1994).  

During the 1910s and 1920s, there were no trees, electricity, gas, or paved roads on Carmel Point. By 1925, the only homes on Carmel Point were the homes of Col. Fletcher Dutton, poet Robinson Jeffers and his wife Una, Playwright Charles Van Riper, musician and attorney Edward G. Kuster, George W. Reamer, and Florence Wells.

On July 31, 1933, Reamer gifted his wife Catherine, lots 18, 20, 21, 22 and a strip of land 20 feet wide off of lots 23 and 24 in Carmel-by-the-Sea, together with all his house hold furniture.

Death
Reamer died on November 20, 1938, Carmel-by-the-Sea, California, at the age of 74. His wife, Catherine, a son and daughter survived him. Catherine Reamer continued to live in the house her husband built in 1908 on Carmel Point. At this time, the area was named Reamer’s Point in honor of her husband. Catherine died on June 20, 1966, at a convalescent hospital in Monterey, California.

See also
 Timeline of Carmel-by-the-Sea, California

References

External links

1864 births
1938 deaths
People from California
People from Carmel-by-the-Sea, California